Narcissus scaberulus is a species of the genus Narcissus (daffodils) in the family Amaryllidaceae. It is classified in Section Apodanthi. It is native to Portugal.

References 

scaberulus
Garden plants
Endemic flora of Portugal
Endemic flora of the Iberian Peninsula